Gode is a city in the Somali Region of  Ethiopia. Located in the Shabelle  Zone, the city was the capital of the Somali Region until 1995 when Jijiga became the capital

Gode Airport, also known as the Ugas Mirad Airport (IATA code GDE), has regular flights operated by Ethiopian Airlines. A bridge over the Shebelle River was built near Gode in 1968.

History 
Before the start of the Ogaden War, Gode was garrisoned by the 5th brigade of the 4th division of the Ethiopian Army, distributed around the town in five military camps. Gode's capture near the end of July 1977 by the Western Somali Liberation Front allowed the Somali forces to consolidate their hold on the Ogaden forces and concentrate on an advance that culminated in the capture of Jijiga. 

According to the historical notes of the Somali Army, Gode was liberated on July 24, 1977 by the regular Somali Army under the leadership of then General Abdullahi Ahmed Irro and his deputy Major Abdulkadir Koosaar. Somalia's 60th division forces under Colonel Irro consisted of the 2nd Armoured Brigade equipped with T-54 MBTs, infantry soldiers, as well as an artillery brigade with 36 artillery and a tank battalion equipped with T-34 MBTs.  

Despite unreserved support by Cuba and the Soviet Union, it took nearly three years for the Ethiopian Army to gain full control of the Gode region long after the Somali Army had systematically withdrawn from the southern front in March 1978. The most remarkable strategic retreat of 6 brigades Somalia's 60th Division involved massive movements of active troops from Gode and  Negeille in the  Bali Sidamo front. Although Gode remained in Somali hands at the end of the Ogaden War, Ethiopian units under Brigadier-General Demisse Bulto, commander of the First Revolutionary Army, recovered Gode as part of Operation Lash by November 1980. Soviet advisors and Cuban troops used the city as one of its three bases to successfully clear the rest of eastern Ethiopia of Somali troops by 3 December. By this point, however, many soldiers in the Somali army joined the liberation front (WSLF) and the conflict continued, albeit without international attention.

Gode has been at the center of several recent famines: one in 1981; the next in 1991, which required the UN High Commission for Refugees to airlift food to 80,000 people stranded outside the town; and most recently in 2000, which caused Gode to swell to a reported size of 100,000 inhabitants. This led John Graham to grimly remark in the Addis Observer, "The main claims to fame of Gode are not inspiring - they are famine and war."

On 26 July 1994, the then-current mayor, Muktar Aden, Gedden was murdered. For several weeks afterward, it was not clear who was responsible, as no individual or group had taken responsibility or had been accused.

Demographics 

According to the 1997 national census, the city's total population was 45,755, of whom 26,081 were males and 19,674 were females. The ethnic breakdown was 99%. Gode is primarily inhabited by the Somalis 97.3%, and other ethnic groups make up 2.3% of the population. Based on the 1997 National census, 11,044 inhabitants, or 24.1% of the population, were in school, of whom 2,766 were males and 1,563 were female. On the other hand, 35,478 people, or 77.5% of the overall population, were illiterate, of whom 17,273 were male and 18,205 female.

Based on 2010 figures from the Central Statistical Agency, Gode has an estimated total population of 950,782, of whom 488,235 were males and 442,089 were females. Gode is the largest town in the Gode woreda.

Climate
Gode has a hot arid climate (Köppen BWh) with uniformly very hot weather and scanty, extremely variable rainfall.

These wet seasons are caused by brief passages of the Intertropical Convergence Zone over the region; however, they are extremely erratic even for an arid region.

Notes 

Populated places in the Somali Region
Ethiopia
Cities and towns in Ethiopia